; 19 December 1935 – 18 October 2017) was a Japanese businessman, the president and chief executive officer (CEO) of Japan Post Holdings, a Japanese state-owned conglomerate, the 26th largest company in the world, and a Fortune Global 500 company.

Overviews 
Nishimuro earned a bachelor's degree in economics from Keio University in 1961.

He joined Toshiba (then Tokyo Shibaura Denki) after graduation, rising to chairman in 2000.

He received the Legion of Honour officer award in 2015.

Following his hospitalization in February 2016, he was succeeded as CEO  by Masatsugu Nagato, who had been president and CEO of Japan Post Bank.

Nishimuro's death was reported on 18 October 2017.  He was 81.

References

1935 births
2017 deaths
Toshiba people
Japanese chief executives
Keio University alumni
20th-century Japanese businesspeople
21st-century Japanese businesspeople
Japan Post Holdings
People from Yamanashi Prefecture
Officiers of the Légion d'honneur